Spain–Albania Friendship Association was an organization based in Spain. The association was recognized by the government of Socialist Albania. The organization was linked to the Communist Party of Spain (Marxist-Leninist). In 1979, the organization began publishing Drita Albania (La Luz de Albania).

References

Albania friendship associations
Spanish friendship associations
Albania–Spain relations